Nationality words link to articles with information on the nation's poetry or literature (for instance, Irish or France).

Events
 June 6 – Statue of Russian poet Alexander Pushkin (died 1837), sculpted by Alexander Opekushin, is unveiled in Strastnaya Square, Moscow

Works published

United Kingdom
 H. C. Beeching and J. W. Mackail lead a group of seven Balliol College, Oxford members in publishing The Masque of B-ll—l, which is immediately suppressed by the authorities
 Robert Bridges, Poems (see also Poems 1873, 1879)
 Robert Browning, Dramatic Idyls, second series (see also Dramatic Idyls 1879)
 Jean Ingelow, Poems, Volume 1 is a reprint the 23rd edition of Poems (1863); Volume 2 is a reprint from the sixth edition of A Story of Doom (1867); (see also Poems: Third Series 1885)
 Andrew Lang, XXII Ballades in Blue China
 William McGonagall, "The Tay Bridge Disaster"
 Emily Pfeiffer, Sonnets and Songs
 Algernon Charles Swinburne:
  The Heptalogia; or, The Seven Against Sense, parodies of seven contemporary poets: Alfred Lord Tennyson, Robert Browning, Elizabeth Browning, Coventry Patmore, Robert Bulwer-Lytton, Dante Gabriel Rossetti and Swinburne himself
 Songs of the Springtides
 Studies in Song
 John Addington Symonds, New and Old
 James Thomson, The City of Dreadful Night, and Other Poems, the title poem was first published in the National Reformer, March 22–May 17, 1874
 William Watson, The Prince's Quest, and Other Poems

United States
 Bret Harte, Poetical Works
 Oliver Wendell Holmes, The Iron Gate and Other Poems
 Sidney Lanier, The Science of English Verse, scholarship
 Henry Wadsworth Longfellow, Ultima Thule
 Richard Henry Stoddard, Poems

Other
 Rosario de Acuña, Morirse a tiempo, Spain
 Rosalia de Castro, Follas novas, Galician poems written in Spain
 Henry Kendall, Songs from the Mountains, Australia
 Guido Mazzoni, Versi, Italy
 Charles G. D. Roberts, Orion and Other Poems, Canada, published at author's expense
 Paul Verlaine, Sagesse, France

Awards and honors

Births
Death years link to the corresponding "[year] in poetry" article:
 January 14 – Joseph Warren Beach (died 1957), American poet, critic and literary scholar
 February 27 – Angelina Weld Grimke (died 1958), African American lesbian journalist and poet
 August 12 – Radclyffe Hall (died 1943), English lesbian poet and novelist
 August 24 – Bahinabai Chaudhari बहिणाबाई चौधरी (died 1951), illiterate, Indian, Marathi-language poet whose son writes down her poems
 August 26 – Guillaume Apollinaire (died 1918), French poet, writer and art critic
 September 16 – Alfred Noyes (died 1958), English poet, best known for his ballads "The Highwayman" (1906) and "The Barrel Organ"
 November 30 – Grant Hervey, born George Henry Cochrane (died 1933), Australian versifier and swindler
 December 2 – Elizabeth Rebecca Ward, née Daniels (died 1978), English versifier
 December 28 – C. Louis Leipoldt (died 1947), South African Afrikaans poet, writer and pediatrician

Deaths
Birth years link to the corresponding "[year] in poetry" article:
 May 8 – Jones Very (born 1813), American essayist, poet, clergyman, and mystic associated with the American Transcendentalism movement
 June 20 – Eliza Dunlop (born 1796), Australian lyricist and ethnographer
 July 7 – Lydia Maria Child, 78 (born 1802), American abolitionist, Indian and women's rights activist, opponent of American expansionism, novelist, journalist and poet
 November 6 – Estanislao del Campo (born 1834), Argentine
 December 22 – George Eliot, pseudonym of Mary Ann Evans, 61 (born 1819), English novelist and poet
 December 30 – Epes Sargent (born 1813), American editor, poet and playwright

See also

 19th century in poetry
 19th century in literature
 List of years in poetry
 List of years in literature
 Victorian literature
 French literature of the 19th century
 Poetry

Notes

19th-century poetry
Poetry